Charles Denison (January 23, 1818 – June 27, 1867) was a Democratic member of the U.S. House of Representatives from Pennsylvania.

Charles Denison (nephew of George Denison) was born in Wyoming Valley, Pennsylvania.  He received a liberal education, and was graduated from Dickinson College in Carlisle, Pennsylvania, in 1838.  He studied law, was admitted to the bar in 1840 and commenced practice in Wilkes-Barre, Pennsylvania.

Denison was elected as a Democrat to the Thirty-eighth, Thirty-ninth, and Fortieth Congresses and served until his death in Wilkes-Barre.  He was a delegate to the 1864 Democratic National Convention.  Interment in Forty Fort Cemetery in Forty Fort, Pennsylvania.

See also

List of United States Congress members who died in office (1790–1899)

Sources

The Political Graveyard

External links
 

1818 births
1867 deaths
People from the Scranton–Wilkes-Barre metropolitan area
Pennsylvania lawyers
Democratic Party members of the United States House of Representatives from Pennsylvania
Dickinson College alumni
19th-century American politicians
19th-century American lawyers